Himmafushi (Dhivehi: ހިއްމަފުށި) is one of the inhabited islands of Kaafu Atoll.

Geography
It is located in North Malé Atoll. The only way to reach it is by boat.

Demography

Economy
The island has its own fish processing company and a boat building facility to ease the demands of its own people.

Infrastructure
Himmafushi has about 850 locals but the population can rise to over 2000 as Himmafushi also houses the minor delinquent prison and a drug rehabilitation centre. Industry in Himmafushi consists of a water bottling facility and a tuna factory.

Tourism
Himmafushi is less than a km long and wide.  There is no alcohol obtainable on the island.

Sport
Himmafushi, a local island, is geographically recognized for its surfing and diving spots.

Transport
To reach the hotels on Himmafushi Island, a public ferryboat or chartered speedboat can be arranged.

Ferry
The ferry takes 50 minutes to reach Himmafushi Island. The ferry departs from Male’ at 14:30 hrs, and the return journey departs from Himmafushi Island at 08:00 hrs. For flights landing after 13:00 hrs, passengers need to take the speedboat transfer or make arrangements to stay in Male’.

References

Islands of the Maldives